Motorsport Network is an American media and technology company headquartered in Miami, FL and London, UK. The company's proprietary brands, websites and OTT operations focus on motor racing and consumer automotive content serving and presenting content to audiences worldwide. The privately held business was founded in 2015 with the acquisition of Motorsport.com and now operates international digital, videogame, print, e-commerce & event businesses.

History
Following the acquisition of Motorsport.com, the company established its headquarters in Miami in 2015. In 2016, it acquired its major competitor, the Haymarket Publishing portfolio of motor racing brands, including the renowned Autosport business that was established in 1950.

The company opened an automotive division with the creation of the Motor1.com brand that subsequently has been supplemented by the creation or acquisition of a number of other motoring platforms including FerrariChat.com, InsideEVs.com, and MYEV.com.

In May 2017, Motorsport Network conducted a multi-lingual Global Fan Survey of Formula One, reputed to be the world's largest fan survey of any sport, with over 200,000 respondents.

In 2018, James Allen, formerly the Financial Times' Formula 1 correspondent and network commentator with UK broadcasters ITV and BBC was appointed as the company's president. In May 2018, Motorsport Network bolstered its presence in the esports market through partnerships with Codemasters, Le Mans and NASCAR. In 2019, the company attracted two new investors, Formula 1 multiple world champion, Fernando Alonso became a shareholder in the esport division and Formula E's founder, Alejandro Agag to a shareholding in the organisation's electric vehicle (EV) operation. In February 2020, Mehul Kapadia, formerly SVP Global Head of Marketing at Tata Communications, joined the company as COO. In April 2020, the company also announced a partnership with Ferrari for an official channel on the Motorsport.tv streaming platform.  This was followed by an official Mercedes Benz Motorsport channel in August 2020. In May 2021, the company announced that it had agreed to acquire the luxury automotive marketplace duPont Registry as the centrepiece of a new division focussed on the buying and selling of supercars and luxury automobiles. In October 2021, the company announced the promotion of Oliver Ciesla to the role of CEO.

Motorsport Network businesses
Motorsport Network businesses are divided into two categories of Motorsport and Automotive. The primary businesses are noted below:

Motorsport businesses

Motorsport.com
Motorsport.com is Motorsport Network's flagship website operated across in 15 languages and 21 national editions.

The platform reports across all forms of international and national motorsport including Formula 1, MotoGP, NASCAR & IndyCar on a rolling 24/7 basis, powered by a multi-edition CMS that aggregates & localizes and aggregating news, video, photos and results. Founded in 1994, the platform has been the cornerstone of Motorsport Network and was acquired by the business in 2012.

Current Motorsport.com editions include: US, France, Germany, Spain, Ukraine, LatAm, Brazil, Australia, Middle East, Switzerland, China, Indonesia, Russia, Italy, Japan, Netherlands, Turkey, Hungary.

Autosport.com
Autosport.com is an English language website covering international motorsport. Headquartered in Richmond, London, the website is a digital evolution of the weekly motorsport magazine, Autosport, that was founded in 1950. The website reports on a broad range of international motorsport from Formula One to two-wheeled series including MotoGP and WSB and the brand is known for its authoritative primary source journalism, with staff journalists covering the sport from trackside locations around the world.

Autosport.com formed part of Motorsport Network's acquisition of Haymarket Media Group's motorsport businesses in November 2016.

Autosport Magazine
Founded in 1950, Autosport Magazine (ISSN 0269-946X) has been in continuous weekly publication since 25 August 1950, covering all aspects of international motorsport including Formula One since the championship's inception 68 years ago. Kevin Turner is Autosport's 18th editor and has held the post since May 2016.

Autosport Awards
The Autosport Awards is an end of the season awards ceremony, that has been running for 35 years.  Hosted at the Grosvenor House Hotel in London, the black tie event has played host to drivers ranging from Ayrton Senna, Lewis Hamilton and Sebastian Vettel to Sir Stirling Moss and John McGuinness.

Autosport International
Autosport International is a European trade and consumer motorsport show. Hosted at Birmingham's NEC since 1991, the event attracts 95,000 visitors and 600 exhibitors, focusing on trade before opening to the public with a 5,000 seat Live Action Arena.

GP Racing Magazine
The GP Racing brand (originally known as F1 Racing) has been built from a foundation of its premium monthly print title. Established in 1996 and published in 10 languages and 14 editions, GP Racing today has a growing digital footprint in addition to its international circulation of 80,000 copies per month.

Motorsport.tv
In 2016, Motorsport.com acquired French pan-European TV-station Motors TV after it went into a bankruptcy procedure. In 2018 the renamed Motorsport.TV decided to stop broadcasting as a linear television station  and closed down the linear television operation, retaining Motorsport.tv as a digital streaming service (OTT). In April 2020 the company announced a partnership with Ferrari for an official channel on the platform.

The network's content includes live motorsport events, news, documentaries, long-format content, historical/archive programming and studio shows. Available through cable, satellite and pay TV, Motorsport.tv in 2018 also launched a custom-developed OTT platform serving multiple devices including iOS, Android and Apple TV. Motorsport.tv is headquartered in Miami, FL.

Motorsport Images
Motorsport Images is a racing and automotive photo and technical drawing archives with over 26 million assets under management.

The group is made up of a portfolio of leading motorsport and automotive photo agencies, including the assignment photo agency LAT Images, which has contributed 14m racing and automotive photos to the group that date back to 1895 and has a large trackside presence of staff photographers at international motor racing events.

The group's assets also contain the archives of Sutton Images and the associated Phipps archive, the Rainer Schlegelmilch archive and the world's foremost collection of race car technical drawings illustrated by Giorgio Piola.

Motorsport Tickets
Motorsport Tickets is a dedicated global motorsport experiences provider, providing official tickets for Formula 1, MotoGP, World Endurance Championship, World Rally Championship and NASCAR. Motorsport Network entered the ticketing market with the acquisition of BookF1.com, before further acquiring the Dutch business SportStadion. BookF1 became Motorsport Live in 2019, before a further rebranding to Motorsport Tickets. In 2020, it was announced that Motorsport Tickets had acquired the accommodation supplier Travel Destinations.

Motorsport Business 
During March 2 2023, Motorsport Network announced the release of there new digital platform, Motorsports Business, a new platform that aims to cover business topics and showcases B2B brands who are active in the Motorsports community. The content on the platform includes  global coverage of the business industry from Europe, US, Asia and beyond and will include written, video and podcast content on the industry.

Automotive businesses

Motor1.com
Motor1.com is Motorsport Network's flagship platform for its portfolio of automotive businesses. Operating in 10 languages with multiple local editions, Motor1.com delivers over 100 video-led car reviews every month produced by house journalists, alongside vehicle buying guides, car news and localized car shopping by market. Motor1.com currently has editions in the US (both English and Spanish), UK, France, Spain, Germany, Italy, Hungary, Turkey, Brazil and Russia.

Motor1.com is headquartered in Motorsport Network's offices in Miami.

InsideEVs
InsideEVs.com is the largest independent electric vehicle content website in the US and was acquired by Motorsport Network in February 2017.

The site provides expert news and information from the rapidly expanding electric vehicle sector for consumer audiences. Its sister site, MYEV.com, is a new and part-used electric car marketplace.

FerrariChat
FerrariChat is an online Ferrari community founded in 2000, the community site has in excess of 165,000 registered owners made up of Ferrari owners and enthusiasts who have contributed over 11m posts to the site.

FerrariChat incorporates an auction platform to enable Ferrari sales within a dedicated community environment, as well as providing classified listings, all of which operate across desktop and responsive mobile versions.

Canossa Events

Canossa Events is a young company run by a young team. The story started in 2011 with a team of 4, eight years after, in 2019, the team comprises 130 passionate professionals. In May 2019 Canossa has joined forces with Motorsport Network to strengthen its global presence and further improve its offer and services.

Organizing charming events on classic and sports cars: from small luxury tours to big rallies or tough circuit races. The team turns the journey into an experience: There's no Road to Happiness, Happiness is the Road.

duPont Registry

Established in 1985, duPont Registry is the pioneer of the luxury and exotic automotive marketplace, dedicated to connecting affluent buyers with high-end exotic cars and luxury brands. In March 2022 duPont Registry announced that it had completed a Series A fundraising with investment from US entrepreneur and philanthropist Barry L Skolnick and from Victor M. Gómez, III, the founder of Gómez Hermanos Kennedy, LLC, one of the largest luxury car dealer networks in the Americas.

Other Motorsport Network businesses and holdings

Motorsport stats
Repository of motor racing results, data, and analytics

Giorgio Piola
Technical motorsport drawings

Motorsport Jobs
Platform for motorsport industry recruitment

Motormarket
Motorsport industry marketplace

Major acquisitions, launches and disposals
1 May 2019 Acquisition of Canossa Events (IT)
10 May 2018 Acquisition of BookF1.com ticketing and travel agency (GB)
11 Jan 2018 The launch of MotorMarket.com (GB)
22 Aug 2017 The launch of Motorsportjobs.com (US)
09 Aug 2017 Acquisition of Schlegelmilch Archive (DE)
24 Jul 2017 Motor1.com launches in Hungary through acquisition (HU)
12 May 2017 Motor1.com launches in Australia through acquisition (AU)
07 Apr 2017 Motorsport Network acquires Sutton Images (UK)
16 Mar 2017 Motor1.com launches in the UK (UK)
28 Feb 2017 Motor1.com launches in Spain (ES)
08 Feb 2017 Motor1.com acquires InsideEVs.com (US)
07 Jan 2017 Motorsport Network acquires an interest in Formula E (UK)
06 Oct 2016 Motorsport Network acquires Haymarket Media Group’s motor racing portfolio (UK)

References

Mass media companies of the United States
Companies based in Miami
Motorsport
Companies listed on the Nasdaq